Harem Suare is a 1999 Turkish drama film directed by Ferzan Özpetek. It was screened in the Un Certain Regard section at the 1999 Cannes Film Festival.

Plot
The old Safiye is telling a young woman the life that she lived during the early 1900s. The beautiful young Safiye is the favorite of the sultan, a man tormented by the crisis of the monarchy and the displacement of the Ottoman Empire in Turkey. Safiye is the most beautiful girl in the Sultan's harem, but she is in love with the young Nadir, a eunuch of the personal guard of the sultan. The two young lovers together plan a future, but the war breaks out, and the girl is forced to escape from her country. After arriving in Italy, Safiye is forced to trade on her beauty, performing on stage in theatre.

Cast
 Marie Gillain as Safiye
 Alex Descas as Nadir
 Lucia Bosé as Old Safiye
 Valeria Golino as Anita
 Malick Bowens as Midhat
 Christophe Aquillon as Sumbul
 Serra Yılmaz as Gulfidan
 Haluk Bilginer as Abdulhamit
 Pelin Batu as Cerkez Cariye
 Nilufer Acikalin as Selma (as Nilüfer Açikalin)
 Ayla Algan as Valide
 Meriç Benlioğlu
 Cansel Elcin as Journaliste
 Başak Köklükaya as Gulbahar
 Gaia Narcisi as Aliye
 Selda Özer as Guya

Bibliography
 Harem Suare - "Synopsis", Festival-Cannes, Access date: 14 June 2022
 Harem Suare - "Un affresco complesso e inusuale, imperniato sul crollo dell'Impero Ottomano", Marco Chiani , Access date: 14 June 2022

References

External links

1999 films
1999 drama films
Films set in Turkey
Films set in the Ottoman Empire
1990s Turkish-language films
1990s French-language films
1990s Italian-language films
Films directed by Ferzan Özpetek
1999 multilingual films
Italian multilingual films
French multilingual films
Turkish multilingual films